Mugnano may refer to some places in Italy:

Mugnano del Cardinale, a municipality of the Province of Avellino, Campania.
Mugnano di Napoli, a municipality of the Province of Naples, Campania.
Mugnano (Perugia), a hamlet of the city of Perugia, Umbria.

See also

Muñano, an Argentine settlement in the Puna de Atacama, Salta Province.
Abra Muñano, an Argentine mountain pass in the Puna de Atacama, Salta Province.